Abraham Owen or Abram Owen (1769–1811) was born in Prince Edward County, Virginia, in 1769. He moved to Kentucky in 1785.

Owen served in the wars with the Indians under generals James Wilkinson and Arthur St. Clair in 1791, and served with colonel John Hardin.

Owen was surveyor of Shelby County, Kentucky, in 1796. He was in the Kentucky Legislature in 1798, and a member of the state constitutional convention the next year.

Owen served as a colonel and as aide-de-camp to William Henry Harrison at the Battle of Tippecanoe, where he was killed in 1811.

The city now known as Owensboro, Kentucky established itself in 1817 with the name "Owensborough," in honor of Owen. Two years later, in 1819, counties in Kentucky and Indiana were formed and named for him.

Welsh connection
Owen was the son of Brackett Owen, who was of Welsh descent, and Elizabeth McGehee. Brackett Owen (son of John Owen and Sara Brackett) was born June 10, 1739, in Prince Edward County, Virginia, and died March 14, 1802, in Shelby County, Kentucky. He  was also a soldier, who established Owen's Station, a small frontier fort used during the later part of the Revolutionary War for protection against the Indians; Owen's Station was located about four miles from present-day Shelbyville. John Owen's great grandparents Humphrey Owen and Catherine Nannau had migrated  from Dolserau, near Dolgellau, north Wales.

References

External links

1769 births
1811 deaths
American military personnel killed in the War of 1812
American military personnel of the Indian Wars
American surveyors
American explorers
Kentucky pioneers
People from Owensboro, Kentucky
Members of the Kentucky House of Representatives
People from Prince Edward County, Virginia
United States Army colonels
Virginia colonial people